Drosera tomentosa, is a species in the carnivorous plant genus Drosera that is endemic to Brazil. It was originally described in 1824 by Augustin Saint-Hilaire. In 1906, Ludwig Diels reduced the species to a variety of D. montana. Diels' taxonomic rank for the species is still supported by some.

See also 
List of Drosera species

References 

tomentosa
Carnivorous plants of South America
Endemic flora of Brazil
Guayana Highlands
Plants described in 1824